Mother Earth were an English acid jazz outfit based in London.  The band members were Matt Deighton on guitar and vocals, Bryn Barklam on Hammond organ, Chris White on drums and Neil Corcoran on bass. Shauna Green was the lead singer on the first album. Prior to their debut live performance, where they played alongside another debutant band Jamiroquai, they started out as a studio project in 1991 with Paul Weller (on "Almost Grown"), James Taylor of the James Taylor Quartet and Simon Bartholomew  from the Brand New Heavies as contributors.

They released three studio albums and one live album. After they disbanded in 1996, two retrospective albums were released in 2001 and 2004.

Subsequent activities 
Deighton subsequently played guitar for Paul Weller's band, and played rhythm guitar in Oasis when Noel Gallagher left mid-tour in 2000.

Since 1996, Matt Deighton has released several critically acclaimed solo-albums.

Bryn Barklam went on to record with The Chords and play organ for the Buzzcocks at the Sex Pistols reunion gig at Finsbury Park. His current band is an instrumental trio consisting of organ, drums and guitar, and is named Captain Hammond.

Discography

Albums 
Stoned Woman (4 April 1992) Acid Jazz JAZID 48
The People Tree (1 September 1993) Acid Jazz JAZID 83
You Have Been Watching (13 October 1995) Acid Jazz
The Desired Effect (live, 1995)
Time of the Future (compilation, 2001)
The Further Adventures of Mother Earth (compilation and previously unreleased, 26 July 2004) Acid Jazz JAZID 60

Singles and EPs 
"Hope You're Feeling Better" JAZID 55 (Santana cover)
"Mr. Freedom" (EP) JAZID 62
"Grow Your Own EP" (EP) JAZID 75
"Find It" JAZID 94
"Jesse" JAZID 100
"Institution Man" JAZID 108
"Freethinker" (EP) JAZID 116

References

Acid jazz ensembles
Musical groups from London
English rock music groups
Musical groups established in 1991
Musical groups disestablished in 1996
1991 establishments in England
Acid Jazz Records artists